Hess House may refer to:

Binks Hess House and Barn, Marcella, Arkansas
Thomas E. Hess House, Marcella, Arkansas
Thomas M. Hess House, Marcella, Arkansas
Philip Hess House, Jefferson City, Missouri
Christian Hess House and Shoemaker's Shop, Schoharie, New York
Elmer Hess House, Wyoming, Ohio
George Hess House and Shop, a contributing building to the Aaronsburg Historic District, Aaronsburg, Pennsylvania
Livingston-Hess House, San Antonio, Texas listed on the National Register of Historic Places
Christian Hess House, a contributing building to the North Wheeling Historic District, Wheeling, West Virginia
Lang-Hess House, Wheeling, West Virginia

See also
The Hess Homestead